The 1934–35 Cornell Big Red men's ice hockey season was the 28th season of play for the program. The teams was coached by Nick Bawlf in his 13th season.

Season
The Cornell hockey team gathered together for the first time after the winter break. The team was looking forward to including some new blood from the freshman squad that had gone undefeated the year before. Unfortunately, the team wasn't able to get any practice in until just 5 days before their first game. The main problem was the same issue the team had faced since its inception: warm weather.

When time came for their first game, the Big Red travelled to Syracuse to take on Colgate, who were using the Colosseum as their home rink. The lack of ice time hampered the Big Red and the team lost a close-fought game despite a strong performance from Oleg Petroff in net. The team was hoping to play a second game before the semester break, however, the poor ice conditions delayed the next game until early February.

The time off allowed the team to practice more while coach Bawlf continued to shuffle the lineup. The changes led to a win for the Big Red in their second game with Guthrie netting both goals in the victory. The rematch a few days later ended with a similar result and the team had a more impressive 6–3 win. The team's final game was against a very strong Hamilton squad and they was soundly beaten, 7–1.

Roster

Standings

Schedule and results

|-
!colspan=12 style=";" | Regular Season

References

Cornell Big Red men's ice hockey seasons
Cornell
Cornell
Cornell
Cornell